Gordon Hutton Bremner (12 November 1917 – 1988) was a Scottish professional footballer who played for Arsenal and Motherwell, as an inside forward. He also played in wartime matches for Scotland and the Scottish League XI.

His elder brother Thomas (known as 'Hutton') was also a footballer, who played in the same position and whose clubs included Motherwell and Queen's Park.

Gordon Bremner died in Cheshire in 1988, at the age of 70.

References

1917 births
1988 deaths
People from Cathcart
Footballers from Glasgow
Scottish footballers
Association football inside forwards
Arsenal F.C. players
Motherwell F.C. players
Scottish Football League players
English Football League players
Scottish Football League representative players
Scotland wartime international footballers
Motherwell F.C. wartime guest players